TPW or TP&W may refer to:

 Tactical Provost Wing
 Tampines West MRT station, Singapore, MRT station abbreviation TPW
 Texas Parks and Wildlife Department
 Texas Press Women
 Tokyo Pro Wrestling
 Toledo, Peoria and Western Railway
 Total precipitable water
Turkish Power Wrestling